First-class cricket is an official classification of the highest-standard international or domestic matches in the sport of cricket. A first-class match is of three or more days' scheduled duration between two sides of eleven players each and is officially adjudged to be worthy of the status by virtue of the standard of the competing teams. Matches must allow for the teams to play two innings each although, in practice, a team might play only one innings or none at all.

The Netherlands national cricket team (Dutch: Nederland se cricketteam) is the team that represents Netherlands and is administered by the Royal Dutch Cricket  Association. Cricket has been played in the Netherlands since at least the 19th century, and in the 1860s was considered a major sport in the country. Other sports – notably football – have long since surpassed cricket in popularity amongst the Dutch, but today there are around 6,000 cricketers in the Netherlands. The first national association, the forerunner of today's Royal Dutch Cricket Association, was formed in 1883 and the Netherlands achieved Associate Membership of the International Cricket Council (ICC) in 1966.

In 2004 Netherlands first played first-class cricket in the ICC Intercontinental Cup, drawing with Scotland in Aberdeen and then going down to an innings defeat against Ireland in Deventer. Netherlands played 33 first-class matches in total, with majority of them against Ireland and Scotland. In total, 50 Dutchmen have made first-class appearances for Netherlands. Peter Borren has played as well as captained more first-class matches for Netherlands than any other Dutchman.

Captain Peter Borren is also the Netherlands' leading run-scorer at first-class level, aggregating 1331 runs. Nineteen centuries including two double centuries have been scored by ten Dutch batsmen in this format. Ryan ten Doeschate's unbeaten 259 runs, scored against Canada in 2006 is the highest individual score by a Dutch batsmen, while he has also the team's best batting average: 142.77. Among the bowlers, Edgar Schiferli and Peter Borren has taken more wickets than any other, claiming 41 wickets each. On the contrary, Timm van der Gugten has the best bowling figures in an innings representing Netherlands, who picked up 7 wickets conceding 68 runs against Namibia in 2013.

Players are initially listed in alphabetical order of their referred name.

Key

List of first-class cricketers

List of captains

See also 

 Netherlands national cricket team
 First-class cricket
 List of Netherlands One Day International cricketers
 List of Netherlands Twenty20 International cricketers

References 

First class
Netherlands

External links 
 Netherlands Cricket Team at ESPNcricinfo
 Netherlands Cricket Team at CricketArchive